The 1948–49 Scottish Division B was won by Raith Rovers F.C. who along with second placed Stirling Albion, were promoted to Division A. East Stirlingshire finished bottom.

Table

References

Scottish Football Archive

Scottish Division Two seasons
2
Scot